Saidi Mohamed Mtanda (born 19 September 1980) is a Tanzanian CCM politician and Member of Parliament for Mchinga constituency since 2010 to 2020.

References

1980 births
Living people
Chama Cha Mapinduzi MPs
Tanzanian MPs 2010–2015
University of Dar es Salaam alumni